Edward Shuttle (1877-1955), was an English bowls player who competed at the British Empire Games.

Bowls career
He participated in the 1938 British Empire Games at Sydney in the fours/rinks event and finished in fifth place.

Personal life
He was an employment exchange manager at the Ministry of Labour by trade and lived at Casttle Street in Reading.

References

English male bowls players
Bowls players at the 1938 British Empire Games
1877 births
1955 deaths
Commonwealth Games competitors for England